The 1939 Bulgarian Cup (in this period the tournament was named Tsar's Cup) was the second cup competition, which took place in parallel to the national championship. The cup was won by Shipka Sofia who beat Levski Ruse 2–0 in the final at the Levski Playground in Sofia.

First round 

|}

Quarter-finals 

|-
!colspan="3" style="background-color:#D0F0C0; text-align:left;" |Replay

|}

Semi-finals 

|}

Final

Details

References

1939
Bulgarian Cup
Cup